Romany Love is a 1931 British musical film directed by Fred Paul and starring Esmond Knight, Florence McHugh and Roy Travers. It was made at Isleworth Studios as a quota quickie.

Cast
 Esmond Knight as Davy Summers  
 Florence McHugh as Taraline  
 Roy Travers as Joe Cayson  
 Rita Cave 
 Rick Barnes

References

Bibliography
 Chibnall, Steve. Quota Quickies: The Birth of the British 'B' Film. British Film Institute, 2007.
 Low, Rachael. Filmmaking in 1930s Britain. George Allen & Unwin, 1985.
 Wood, Linda. British Films, 1927-1939. British Film Institute, 1986.

External links

1931 films
British musical films
1931 musical films
Films directed by Fred Paul
Films shot at Isleworth Studios
Quota quickies
British black-and-white films
1930s English-language films
1930s British films